This list of lists may include both lists that distinguish between ethnic origin and religious practice, and lists that make no such distinction. Some of the constituent lists also may have experienced additions and/or deletions that reflect incompatible approaches in this regard.

By type
List of converts to Judaism
List of European Jewish nobility
List of fictional Jews
List of former Jews
List of Jewish biblical figures
List of Jewish Nobel laureates
List of Karaite Jews
List of LGBT Jews
List of Sephardic Jews
Lists of Jews associated with literature and journalism

By occupation or activity in Judaism

List of Jewish Kabbalists
List of Jewish mysticism scholars
List of Jews in religion
List of High Priests of Israel
List of Jewish atheists and agnostics
List of rabbis

By secular occupation or activity
List of Jewish anarchists
List of Jewish chess players
List of Jewish economists
List of Jewish feminists
List of Jewish historians
List of Jewish mathematicians
List of Jewish scientists
List of Jewish United States Supreme Court justices
List of Jews in politics
List of Jews in sports
List of Jews in the performing arts
List of Jewish actors
List of Jewish musicians
Lists of Jews associated with the visual arts

By country

Lists of American Jews 
List of African-American Jews
List of Azerbaijani Jews
List of Jews from the Arab world
List of Asian Jews
List of Bosnian Jews
List of Canadian Jews
List of Caribbean Jews
List of East European Jews
List of French Jews
List of German Jews
List of Galician (Eastern Europe) Jews
List of Jews from Sub-Saharan Africa
List of Latin American Jews
List of Mexican Jews
List of North European Jews
List of Oceanian Jews
List of South-East European Jews
List of West European Jews

See also
 Crypto-Judaism
 Jewish religious movements